alpha-Eucaine is a drug that was previously used as a local anesthetic. It was designed as an analog of cocaine and was one of the first synthetic chemical compounds to find general use as an anesthetic.

Synthesis

The Aldol condensation between two equivalents of acetone gives Mesityl oxide [141-79-7] (1) (isophorone is a side-product of this reaction). Ammonolysis of mesityl oxide formed diacetonamine [625-04-7] (2). The reaction of this product with acetone then gives 2,2,6,6-tetramethyl-4-piperidone [826-36-8] (3). N-methylation of the secondary amine gives 1,2,2,6,6-pentamethylpiperidin-4-one [5554-54-1] (4). Cyanohydrin formation gives CID:434556 (5). Esterification of the tertiary alcohol with benzoyl chloride gives (6). Pinner reaction of the nitrile with EtOH/H+ affords alpha-eucaine (7).

See also
 Eucaine, a related local anesthetic

References

Local anesthetics
Piperidines
Benzoate esters
Methyl esters